Rhacophorus monticola is a species of frog in the family Rhacophoridae endemic to Sulawesi, Indonesia. Its natural habitats are subtropical or tropical moist montane forests and rivers.
It is threatened by habitat loss.

References

monticola
Endemic fauna of Indonesia
Amphibians of Sulawesi
Taxa named by George Albert Boulenger
Amphibians described in 1896
Taxonomy articles created by Polbot